Eye of Horus is a computer game published in 1989 by Fanfare (Britannica Software) for the Amiga.

Plot
In Eye of Horus, the player is Horus and must find the pieces of his father, Osiris, and assemble them in order to defeat the evil Set. The pieces of Osiris are located within a labyrinth where hieroglyphs come alive to prevent the player from completing this task. Horus possesses papyrus darts to destroy the evil that attacks him, and he also has the ability to turn into a hawk to fly over certain enemies to help him complete his mission. Horus can pick up amulets that can increase his weapons' powers or assist him in other ways.

Reception
The game was reviewed in 1991 in Dragon #169 by Hartley, Patricia, and Kirk Lesser in "The Role of Computers" column. The reviewers gave the game 1 out of 5 stars.

Reviews
ST Format - Oct, 1989
Atari ST User - Sep, 1989
The One - Nov, 1989
The Games Machine - Jan, 1990
The Games Machine - Oct, 1989
ASM (Aktueller Software Markt) - Sep, 1989
ASM (Aktueller Software Markt) - Jan, 1990

References

External links
Eye of Horus at the Amiga Hall of Light

Review in Compute!
Review in Info

1989 video games
Amiga games
Atari ST games
Commodore 64 games
Denton Designs games
DOS games
Logotron games
Video games developed in the United Kingdom
Video games scored by David Whittaker
Video games scored by Fred Gray